Gareth Trayner (born 7 June 1980) is a former British alpine skier who represented Great Britain at the 2002 Winter Olympics in Salt Lake City. Trayner specialised in Slalom and Giant Slalom.  He placed twenty second in the men's slalom at the 2002 winter games.  Trayner officially retired from competitive ski racing in 2004.

See also
Alpine skiing at the 2002 Winter Olympics - Men's slalom

References

External links
 Sports-Reference.com - Gareth Trayner

1980 births
Living people
Scottish male alpine skiers
Olympic alpine skiers of Great Britain
Alpine skiers at the 2002 Winter Olympics
People educated at Strathallan School
Sportspeople from Fife